10 days in Sun City is a 2017 Nigerian romantic action comedy film which premiered on 17 June 2017. It is executively produced by AY Makun, who is also a lead character in the film. It is directed by Adze Ugah, written by Kehinde Ogunlola and produced by Darlington Abuda. The film is the third installment in the Akpos Adventure franchise and was shot at locations in Lagos and Johannesburg, South Africa.

The film tells the story of an aspiring beauty queen who was brought to stardom, and in the process, had to pay the price of losing her peace and joy by denouncing her fiancé, who happened to be her manager as well. She was on the verge of being enslaved by her God Father when he got dealt with by some of the people he had deprived of benefits in time past. It explains that true love conquers all, irrespective of barriers or challenges encountered.

Cast
 Richard Mofe-Damijo as Otunba Williams
 Adesua Etomi as Bianca
 AY Makun as Akpos
 Mercy Johnson as Monica
 Folarin "Falz" Falana as Seyi
 Gbenro Ajibade as Otunba Bodyguard
 Uti Nwachukwu as Pageant host
 Yvonne Jegede
 Miguel A. Núñez Jr.
 Amanda Du-Pont as Kimberley (Kim K.)
 Thenjiwe Moseley
 Celeste Ntuli as Bar owner
 2face Idibia as himself (cameo)
 Alibaba Akpobome as Chief (cameo)
 Clinton miles as ay makun fan

Awards

See also
 List of Nigerian films of 2017

References 

2017 films
2010s English-language films
2010s action comedy-drama films
2017 romantic comedy-drama films
2017 comedy films
2017 action films
English-language Nigerian films
Films shot in Lagos
Films set in Lagos
Films set in South Africa
Nigerian romantic comedy-drama films
Nigerian action films
Nigerian comedy-drama films
Films shot in South Africa
Nigerian romantic comedy films